Valea Mare is a commune in Ungheni District, Moldova. It is composed of four villages: Buzduganii de Jos, Buzduganii de Sus, Morenii Vechi and Valea Mare.

References

Communes of Ungheni District
Populated places on the Prut